Crying Ladies is a 2003 Filipino comedy-drama film directed by Mark Meily based on his Palanca-winning screenplay Bayad Luha. The film stars Sharon Cuneta as Stella, Hilda Koronel as Aling Doray, and Angel Aquino as Choleng, who are hired as professional funeral mourners by a wealthy Chinese-Filipino family in Manila's Chinatown, while they deal with their own personal problems. It also stars Eric Quizon, Ricky Davao, Julio Pacheco, Shamaine Buencamino, Sherry Lara and Raymond Bagatsing in supporting roles.

The film was released on December 25, 2003, in the Philippines as an entry to the 2003 Metro Manila Film Festival where it won five major awards including Best Picture, Best Director, Best Actor for Quizon, Best Supporting Actress for Koronel, and Best Child Performer for Pacheco. It was the Philippines' submission to the 77th Academy Awards for the Academy Award for Best Foreign Language Film.

Plot 
After the untimely death of his father, Wilson (Eric Quizon) is tasked by his wealthy Chinese-Filipino family to look for professional funeral mourners who will participate in the funeral rites. Despite the waning popularity of professional mourners, his family insists on hiring them so that his father can have a traditional Chinese funeral.

While searching at Manila's Chinatown, he meets Stella (Sharon Cuneta), a cash-strapped mother who recently released after serving time for fraud. Despite her initial apprehensions and realization that Wilson's father was responsible for her imprisonment, she agrees to be a funeral mourner after accepting a 500-peso advanced payment from Wilson. Stella tags two of her friends, Aling Doray "Rhoda Rivera" (Hilda Koronel), a former B-star actress who played bits in movies and who frequently waxes nostalgia about her former acting career, and Choleng (Angel Aquino), a pious woman who vows to avoid sinning after having repeated affairs with her friend's husband Ipe (Raymond Bagatsing).

During their stint as professional mourners, the three bond and talk about their experiences, struggles, and dreams in life. Stella is sad because of the impending departure of her young son Bong (Julio Pacheco), who will be moving to Cagayan de Oro, along with her former husband Guido (Ricky Davao) and his new wife Cecile (Shamaine Buencamino). She wants to have a decent and stable job so she can reclaim custody and reunite with her son. Aling Doray frequently reminisces about her former career playing bit parts in movies, especially in Darna and the Giants. Choleng is trying to resist Ipe's advances and end their affair and make up for it by doing more religious and charity works.

After the burial of his father, Wilson, who has a tumultuous relationship with his father, decided to forgive him for not being a good father and to start appreciating the good things he has done. He calls Stella to inform her that a Japanese promotion company is hiring entertainers. Stella immediately applies and gets the job, where she becomes a successful karaoke actress. Aling Doray gets an offer to reprise her role in the sequel of Darna and the Giants where she hopes to revive her acting career. Choleng has moved on after ending her affair with Ipe and is now a marriage counselor in her parish.

Cast

 Sharon Cuneta as Stella Mate
 Hilda Koronel as Aling Doray/Rhoda Rivera
 Angel Aquino as Choleng
 Eric Quizon as Wilson Chua
 Ricky Davao as Guido
 Julio Pacheco as Bong
 Shamaine Buencamino as Cecile
 Sherry Lara as Mrs. Chua
 Raymond Bagatsing as Ipe
 Gilleth Sandico as Becky
 Joan Bitagcol as Grace
 Edgar Mortiz as Mang Gusting
 Bella Flores as Lost Lady
 Johnny Delgado as the Priest
 Lou Veloso as Barangay Chairman

Production
Crying Ladies was based on Bayad Luha, a screenplay written by Meily in 2000 as part of his thesis for a screenwriting workshop by Filipino scriptwriter Armando Lao. He later entered it into the Don Carlos Palanca Awards in 2001 where it won the Third Prize in Dulaang Pampelikula (Filipino Division). Unitel Pictures producer Tony Gloria read the screenplay and described it as "unput-downable." Gloria offered the lead role to Cuneta, due to their previous collaborations in Dear Heart, P.S. I Love You, and Forgive and Forget. The role of Aling Doray was initially offered to Nida Blanca before she was murdered. As such, the role had to be re-written for Hilda Koronel.

Crying Ladies is the first Filipino film that makes extensive use of MILO Motion Control System and also the first Filipino film to be shot on the latest Kodak Eastman 2 film stock. It is the second Filipino movie to be locally recorded and mixed in Dolby SRD 5.1 technology.

Release

Critical reception
Crying Ladies received mixed to positive reviews from critics. On review aggregator website Rotten Tomatoes, the film has an approval rating of 92% based on 13 reviews. On Metacritic, the film has a score of 54% based on reviews from 5 critics, indicating "mixed or average reviews".

The story was praised by several critics. A.O. Scott of New York Times wrote, "Its most winning attribute is a kind of sloppy, unassuming friendliness, a likability aptly reflected in its characters." Kevin Thomas of Los Angeles Times described the film as "An endearing comedy that deftly blends sentiment and grit and features a clutch of top Filipino stars." Eddie Cockrell of Variety praised Meily's direction and the cast's performance: “Crying Ladies moves smartly and evenly under the direction of debut helmer Mark Meily. Perfs sparkle, with each thesp comfortable navigating between broad comedy and legitimate pathos."

The film received some negative reviews. Mark Holcomb of Village Voice criticized the editing, but still praised the film, particularly Cuneta's performance: "Cuneta delivers an engaging, surprisingly coarse performance, considering her onetime Philippines-sweetheart status, and the subtle revelations concerning ritual and loss in Meily’s story serve her well. More judicious editing was surely called for, but Crying Ladies succeeds as first-rate melodrama." V.A. Musetto, writing for New York Post, also criticized the film: "There aren't many surprises as the story unfolds in soap-opera fashion, with a happy ending for all concerned."

Music

Soundtrack

Crying Ladies was accompanied with a soundtrack during its theatrical release for the promotion of the album. The album contains pop/rock, R&B and OPM songs from various artists such as Kuh Ledesma, South Border and Parokya ni Edgar. It's carrier single Rainbow became a radio smash hit in 2004.

Accolades

See also

 Cinema of the Philippines

References

External links
 

2003 films
Filipino-language films
Philippine comedy-drama films
2000s English-language films
Films directed by Mark Meily